Agrigel–La Creuse–Fenioux was a French professional cycling team that existed in 1996. The team participated in the 1996 Tour de France.

Team roster
The following is a list of riders on the Agrigel–La Creuse squad during the 1996 season, with age given for 1 January 1996.

References

External links

Cycling teams based in France
Defunct cycling teams based in France
1996 establishments in France
1996 disestablishments in France
Cycling teams established in 1996
Cycling teams disestablished in 1996